"Age of Consent" is a song by New Order. It appears on their 1983 album Power, Corruption & Lies. A Howie B remix was produced in 1995 for (the rest of) New Order compilation album.

The song has been played 208 times in concert by the band, making its live debut in 1982. It returned to live performances in 2011, following a 22-year absence from setlists, having last been played live in 1989.

It was revealed during a Twitter listening party in 2020, that Stephen Morris's drums recorded for the song were recycled from the Hannett version of "Love Will Tear Us Apart" with slight subtle alterations.

Personnel
 Bernard Sumner – vocals, guitars
 Peter Hook – 4- and 6-stringed bass
 Stephen Morris – drums, percussion
 Gillian Gilbert – synthesizers and programming
 New Order – production
 Michael Johnson – engineering
 Barry Sage and Mark Boyne – assistants

Cover versions and renditions
It has been covered by numerous bands and performers, including Arcade Fire, Geographer, The Essex Green, Buffalo Tom, and Built to Spill. Cayetana provided a cover of "Age of Consent" for the soundtrack to the film To All the Boys I've Loved Before.

References

New Order (band) songs
1983 songs
Songs written by Bernard Sumner
Songs written by Peter Hook
Songs written by Gillian Gilbert
Songs written by Stephen Morris (musician)
Jangle pop songs